The 1973 Wrestling World Cup was held from May 19 to 20 in Toledo, Ohio. This was the first World Cup edition, which was contested in the dual meet format instead of individual tournament. The competition drew four freestyle wrestling champion teams, representing Europe, Asia, and North America — Soviet Union, Japan, and Canada respectively, which had the best final standings at the 1973 World Wrestling Championships, and the host country, the United States team. As during the previous edition, the winner of the World Cup was the USSR National Team.

Medal summary

References

Sources

News

External links
 World Cup, Freestyle Seniors, 1973-05-19 Toledo (USA). Institut für Angewandte Trainingswissenschaft Ringen Datenbanken (Wrestling Database).

Wrestling World Cup
1973 in sports in Ohio

International wrestling competitions hosted by the United States

1973 in sport wrestling
May 1973 events
Sports in Toledo, Ohio